Cristian Valentin Muscalu (born 3 October 1989) is a Romanian professional football midfielder.

Club career
Muscalu started his youth career at Steaua spending 8 years, before separating from the club, he joined Gică Popescu's football academy playing there for a year, as well for CSŞ Nucet. During 2006 he got noticed by youth coach Marcel Răducanu who sees him linked with a move to 1. FC Köln. During his early career, Muscalu was for a few weeks on trial at Osasuna, Hertha Berlin and TSV 1860 Munich.

Muscalu started as senior playing the first half of the 2007–08 season with Romanian second-level side CSM Jiul Petroșani. During winter-break he moved abroad to Belgium and signed with Sint-Truidense. He made his official debut for Sint-Truidense on 12 April 2008 in the Belgian Pro League in a 2–0 loss to Westerlo. However, a year later he was transferred to Bosnia and Herzegovina's FK Slavija to gain more experience, where he won a national cup. On 13 July 2009, he signed for FK Baku in Azerbaijan. After not having many chances, he played the last six months of that season loaned out to Chernomorets Burgas playing in the Bulgarian First League. After summer 2010, Muscalu had a short spell with Polish second league club Tur Turek which lasted until October. Before joining with Turek, he was also on trial with Lech Poznań and Croatian club Istra 1961.

In early 2011, he joined on a free transfer Serbian side FK Borac Čačak, but didn't play any game. In the summer of 2011, he was close to sign for Swiss club SC Kriens however, the contract did not materialize. On July, Muscalu returned to his home country to play in Liga I with newly promoted team Ceahlăul Piatra Neamţ.

He was regarded as a good talent of Romania, but he was affected by numerous injuries.

In the summer 2013, Cristian Muscalu joined newly promoted Serbian SuperLiga side FK Voždovac. In February 2014, Muscalu signed with Beira-Mar of Portugal.

In summer 2014 Muscalu returned to Romania and has played with lower-league sides FC Caransebeș and Metalul Frăsinet.

International career
Muscalu was a member of the Romanian under-19 national team.

Honours
Slavija Sarajevo
 Bosnia and Herzegovina Football Cup: 2009

References

External links
 
 
 

Living people
1989 births
Footballers from Bucharest
Romanian footballers
Association football midfielders
Romania youth international footballers
Belgian Pro League players
Premier League of Bosnia and Herzegovina players
Azerbaijan Premier League players
First Professional Football League (Bulgaria) players
Serbian SuperLiga players
Liga I players
Liga Portugal 2 players
Liga II players
National League (English football) players
CSM Jiul Petroșani players
FC Steaua București players
Sint-Truidense V.V. players
FK Slavija Sarajevo players
FC Baku players
PFC Chernomorets Burgas players
Tur Turek players
FK Borac Čačak players
CSM Ceahlăul Piatra Neamț players
FK Voždovac players
S.C. Beira-Mar players
Poole Town F.C. players
FC Rapid București players
Romanian expatriate footballers
Expatriate footballers in Belgium
Expatriate footballers in Bosnia and Herzegovina
Expatriate footballers in Azerbaijan
Expatriate footballers in Bulgaria
Expatriate footballers in Poland
Expatriate footballers in Serbia
Expatriate footballers in Portugal
Expatriate footballers in England
Romanian expatriate sportspeople in Belgium
Romanian expatriate sportspeople in Bosnia and Herzegovina
Romanian expatriate sportspeople in Azerbaijan
Romanian expatriate sportspeople in Bulgaria
Romanian expatriate sportspeople in Poland
Romanian expatriate sportspeople in Serbia
Romanian expatriate sportspeople in Portugal
Romanian expatriate sportspeople in England